James Hughes was an English footballer who played as a defender. He was born in Bootle in December 1885 and played for Liverpool before signing for Crystal Palace in 1909. Between then and 1920 Hughes made 200 appearances for Crystal Palace in the Southern League, scoring 15 times. In 1920 Hughes moved on to Chatham.

He earned one representative cap with the Southern League XI.

Hughes died in 1948, aged 62 or 63.

References

External links
LFC History profile
James Hughes at holmesdale.net

English footballers
Liverpool F.C. players
1885 births
Sportspeople from Bootle
1948 deaths
Date of birth missing
Date of death missing
Crystal Palace F.C. players
Southern Football League players
Southern Football League representative players
Chatham Town F.C. players
Association football defenders